James Stirton Robertson (4 March 1903 – 4 October 1985) was an Australian rules footballer who played with Carlton in the Victorian Football League (VFL).

Notes

External links 

Carlton Football Club players
Australian rules footballers from Melbourne
1903 births
1985 deaths
People from Carlton, Victoria